My Heart Belongs to Daddy is a 1942 American comedy film directed by Robert Siodmak and starring Richard Carlson, Martha O'Driscoll and Cecil Kellaway.

Main cast
Richard Carlson as Prof. Richard Inglethorpe Culbertson Kay, aka R.I.C. Kay, aka Rick
Martha O'Driscoll as Joyce Whitman
Cecil Kellaway as Alfred Fortescue
Frances Gifford as Grace Saunders
Florence Bates as Mrs. Saunders
Mabel Paige as nurse Eckles
Velma Berg as Babs Saunders
Francis Pierlot as Dr. Mitchell
Ray Walker as Eddie Summers - band leader
Fern Emmett as Josephine - the Maid
Milton Kibbee as chauffeur
Betty Farrington as cook

References

External links

1942 romantic comedy films
American romantic comedy films
American black-and-white films
Films directed by Robert Siodmak
Paramount Pictures films
Films produced by Sol C. Siegel
Films with screenplays by F. Hugh Herbert
1940s American films